Louis R. Desmarais (16 February 1923 – 25 March 2017) was a Liberal party member of the House of Commons of Canada. He was a Chartered Accountant by career. In 1968, he became president of Les Entreprises de Transport Provincial limitée, and he was president of Canada Steampship Line, whose head manager in Quebec City was André Poliquin.

He represented the riding of Dollard since his victory there in the 1979 federal election and his re-election in 1980. Desmarais was defeated in the 1984 federal election by Gerry Weiner of the Progressive Conservative Party. He served in the 31st and 32nd Canadian Parliaments.

His brother Jean Noël Desmarais was a physician and senator, and his brother Paul Desmarais was a billionaire businessman.

References

External links
 

1923 births
2017 deaths
Liberal Party of Canada MPs
Members of the House of Commons of Canada from Quebec
Politicians from Greater Sudbury
Canadian accountants